Robina State High School is a coeducational independent public secondary school based in Robina, on the Gold Coast in Queensland, Australia. The school has a total enrolment of more than 1400 students, with an official count of 1469 students in 2021.

Since 2020, the school's current role of principal has been held by Benjamin Weeks. The school also consists of four deputy principals, one business manager, fourteen heads of department, one guidance officer, one school-based nurse, one school-based police officer, one school chaplain and three year level coordinators.

Curriculum

Specialist programs
Specialist programs available to students at Robina State High School include:
 Academic Excellence Program (also known as the 'Kingfisher Program')
 Community - Action - Service (CAS) Program
 Japanese Immersion
 Robina Sports Academy
 Baseball Academy
 Futsal/Football Academy
 General Sports Academy
 Golf Academy
 Netball Academy
 Triathlon Academy

English
English is a compulsory core subject across the Year 7–10 curriculum. Students in Years 8 and 9 undertake either Intermediate English or English Extension. English subjects available to students in Years 11 and 12 include the General subjects of English, English as an Additional Language, Literature and English and Literature Extension (Year 12 only), and the Applied subject of Essential English.

Mathematics
Mathematics is a compulsory core subject across the Year 7–10 curriculum. Students in Years 8 and 9 undertake either Intermediate Mathematics or Mathematics Extension, whereas students in Year 10 undertake one of the subjects of Intermediate Mathematics, Mathematics Extension or Foundation Mathematics. Mathematics subjects available to students in Years 11 and 12 include the General subjects of General Mathematics, Mathematical Methods and Specialist Mathematics, and the Applied subject of Essential Mathematics.

Humanities
The Humanities faculty incorporates the compulsory core subjects of History and Geography across the Year 7–10 curriculum. Elective Humanities subjects available to students in Year 9 in include the Business subjects of Business Education and Digital Graphics. Elective Humanities subjects available to students in Year 10 include Business and Certificate I in Skills for Vocational Pathways (FSK10213). Humanities subjects available to students in Years 11 and 12 include the General subjects of Accounting, Ancient History, Business, Economics, Geography, Legal Studies and Modern History, and the Applied subject of Tourism.

Science
Science is a compulsory core subject across the Year 7–10 curriculum. Students in Years 8, 9 and 10 undertake either Intermediate Science or Science Extension. Elective Science subjects available to students in Year 10 include Aquatic Practices and Health Science. Science subjects available to students in Years 11 and 12 include the General subjects of Biology, Chemistry, Marine Science and Physics, and the Applied subject of Aquatic Practices.

Languages
Japanese is the Language Other Than English administered at Robina State High School. In Years 7 and 8, Japanese is a compulsory subject undertaken for three semesters over the two-year period and becomes an elective subject from Year 9. Alternatively, academic students from Years 7–10 have opportunities to participate in the Japanese Immersion program.

Health and Physical Education
Health & Physical Education is a compulsory core subject across the Year 7–10 curriculum. Health & Physical Education subjects available to students in Years 11 and 12 include the General subject of Physical Education and the Applied subjects of Sport & Recreation (Baseball, Golf, Futsal/Football, Netball and Triathlon).

The Arts
Year 7 students undertake the Arts Specialisation subjects of Dance, Drama Extension, Music and Visual Arts, or the General Arts course incorporating visual and/or performing arts. In Year 8, students participate in one of the Arts subjects of Dance, Drama, Music and Visual Arts for one semester. Arts subjects available to students in Year 9 include Dance, Drama, Media Arts, Music and Visual Arts, whereas the Year 10 curriculum consists of the Arts subjects of Dance, Drama, Music, Visual Arts, Certificate II in Creative Industries (CUA20215) and Film, Television & New Media. Arts subjects available to students in Years 11 and 12 include the General subjects of Drama, Music Extension – Composition (Year 12 only), Music Extension – Performance (Year 12 only) and Visual Art, and the Applied subjects of Dance in Practice, Drama in Practice, Media Arts in Practice, Music in Practice and Visual Arts in Practice.

Home Economics
Home Economics is optionally studied for one term in Year 7 and by all students for one semester in Year 8. Home Economics subjects available to students in Year 9 include Food Studies, General Home Economics and Introduction to Fashion, whereas the Year 10 curriculum consists of the Home Economics subjects of Fashion, Food Studies and Introduction to Hospitality.

Technology
In Year 8, the Technology subject of Industrial Technology & Design is studied for one semester whereas the Year 9–10 curriculum consists of the elective Technology subjects of Digital Technologies, Graphics and Industrial Technology & Design. Technology subjects available to students in Years 11 and 12 include the General subjects of Design, Digital Solutions and Food & Nutrition, and the Applied subjects of Furnishing Skills, Hospitality Practices, Industrial Graphics Skills and Industrial Technology Skills.

Vocational education and training

 Certificate I & II in Information, Digital Media & Technology (ICT10115/ICT20115)
 Certificate II in Engineering (Pathways) (MEM20413)
 Certificate II in Furniture Making (Pathways) (MSF20313)
 Certificate II in Hospitality (SIT20316)
 Certificate II in Public Safety (Aquatic Rescue) (PUA21012)
 Certificate II in Skills for Work & Vocational Pathways (FSK20113)
 Certificate III in Business Administration (BSB30415)
 Certificate III in Early Childhood Education & Care (CHC30113)
 Certificate III in Fitness (SIS30315)
 Certificate III in Health Services Assistance/Certificate II in Health Support Services (HLT33115/HLT23215)
 Certificate III in Screen & Media (CUA31015)
 Certificate IV in Dance (CUA40113)
 Certificate IV in Music Industry (CUA40915)
 Diploma of Business (SB50207)

Co-curricular activities
Co-curricular activities available to students at Robina State High School include:

 Parliamentary World Youth Debate Congress
 Gold Coast debating competition
 Instrumental Music
 String Ensemble
 Concert Band
 Stage Band
 Big Band
 Percussion Ensemble
 Leo's Club
 Student Council
 Junior and senior school dance troupes
 Showcase activities
 Acoustic Night
 Dance Night
 Dramafest
 Extension Music Showcase
 Student leadership activities
 Altitude Day
 GU Business Ambassadors
 International Ambassadors
 YLead
 Indigenous support activities
 Support staff-coordinated lunchtime activities for students
 Harmony Day
 Inter-school sports programs
 Recreational sport program
 Community - Action - Service (CAS) Program
 Art workshops
 Beach challenges
 Dragon boating
 Go-karting
 Laser skirmish
 Organising and running fundraising barbeques
 Sailing
 Japanese Immersion
 Interacting with Japanese guests
 Japanese art, cooking and cultural activities
 World online Japanese art and language competitions
 Taiko Drum Club
 Immersion camps

Notable alumni
 Arianna Clarke, professional Australian rules footballer (Brisbane Lions)
 Lyndon Dykes, professional association footballer
 Haeji Kang, professional golfer
 Tammy McMillan, professional baseball player
 Jasmine Parr, professional boxer and kickboxer
 Taylah Welch, professional baseball player
 Amy Yang, professional golfer

References

External links
 

Schools on the Gold Coast, Queensland
Public high schools in Queensland
Robina, Queensland
Educational institutions established in 1996
1996 establishments in Australia